John William Wevers (born June 4, 1919, in little Baldwin - July 22, 2010 Toronto, Ontario) was an American professor emeritus in the Department of Near Eastern and Middle Studies, at the University of Toronto. He is one of the scholars well known for his studies in the Septuagint.

Life 

He was the son of Bernard Wevers and Willemina (Te Grootenhuis) Wevers. In 1942 he married Grace Della Brondsema and they had four children.

Education 

In 1940 he earned a BA in classics from the Calvin College. Three years later, in 1943 he earned his ThB at Calvin Theological Seminary, Grand Rapids, Michigan. From 1946 he held his ThD from Princeton Theological Seminary under the tutelage of Henry Snyder Gehman.

Teaching 

From 1963 he become professor at the University of Toronto. From 1972 to 1975 he was chair of the Department's Graduate Studies and from 1975 to 1980 chair of the combined College Departments of Near Eastern Studies.

The John William Wevers Prize in Septuagint Studies 

In memory of John William Wevers to honor his many contributions to Septuagint studies the International Organization for Septuagint and Cognate Studies (IOSCS) offers an annual prize of $350 named in memory of John William Wevers to be awarded to an outstanding paper in the field of Septuagint studies.

Bibliography

Books

Articles

References

Sources 

1919 births
2010 deaths
Old Testament scholars
Academic staff of the University of Toronto